Newnata is an unincorporated community in Stone County, Arkansas, United States.  It is in the Ozark Mountains region of the northern part of the state and is near the town of Mountain View.

Overview 

Newnata's zip code is 72680, although it previously used the zip code 72657, which was the zip code formerly served by the small post office at Newnata (which is no longer in operation). Before being named Newnata (New Birth) by the U.S. Postal Service, it was called "Crystal Hill". The Crystal Hill Cemetery is still in use.

The town has no mayor, no city hall, and used to be a larger hub of activity in the late 19th century to the mid-20th century. Consisting of farms, the town has no economy other than a rural Ozark economy based on subsistence farming, cattle, and other livestock. The area is filled with wildlife. People in the area consist of descendants of original settlers and other folks "from off" as the people of Stone County refer to anyone not descended from early settlers. There is no hub of activity in the "town" any longer, though the most active area is the tire repair and sales shop located directly off Highway 66. Though designated a town, it receives no mail to any resident of "Newnata", but has been taken into the greater area served by the Timbo, Arkansas township. Thus, mail to the decentralized "town" is designated as "Timbo". The area has voluminous unpaved roads; and also includes the North Sylamore Creek; and the middle fork, which is called "The Roasting Ear Creek"; and the South Fork of the Sylamore Creek, which lies entirely on private lands. East of the old township is a natural spring flowing out of the hill by the side of the road, approximately one mile east of the tire shop that flows with the Panther Creek into The Roasting Ear Creek. The area epitomizes the Ozark region in general. Nearby Mountain View is the "Folk Music Capital of the World." Nearly every family in the vicinity has stringed instruments and many residents are proficient at a variety of traditional mountain instruments including the guitar, harmonica, dobro, upright bass, mandolin, fiddle, and banjo.

References

Unincorporated communities in Stone County, Arkansas
Unincorporated communities in Arkansas
Arkansas placenames of Native American origin